Zerah Zequiel "Rip" Hagerman (June 20, 1888 – January 30, 1930) was a Major League Baseball player who played pitcher from -. He would play for the Chicago Cubs and Cleveland Indians.

In May 1910 Hagerman signed with the Lincoln Railsplitters of the Western League. On December 7, 1912 Hagerman was traded by the Railsplitters to the Portland Beavers of the Pacific Coast League.

Hagerman married Maude McQuade in Chicago, Illinois, on May 17, 1910.

In November 1914 the Chicago Whales of the Federal League and Hagerman negotiated a contract, but failed to come to an agreement.

The Indians released Hagerman to the Portland Beavers of the Pacific Coast League in May 1916.

Before the 1917 season Portland traded Hagerman to the St. Paul Saints. At first he was reluctant to join the club and voiced his desire to return to the Pacific Coast League, however, he signed with St. Paul in March 1917.

References

External links

1888 births
1930 deaths
Major League Baseball pitchers
Baseball players from Kansas
Chicago Cubs players
Cleveland Indians players
Cleveland Naps players
Topeka White Sox players
Lincoln Railsplitters players
Portland Beavers players
St. Paul Saints (AA) players
Oklahoma City Indians players
People from Lyndon, Kansas